Kooralgin is a rural locality in the Toowoomba Region, Queensland, Australia. In the  Kooralgin had a population of 46 people.

History 
Kooralgin Provisional School opened on 10 April 1916. It closed in 1923. It closed on 28 January 1963. Opened as Kooralgin Provisional School No 1493 and closed in 1923. It reopened in 1930 as a half-time school in conjunction with Claredale Provisional School (meaning they shared a single teacher). About 1932 the Claredale school closed and Kooralgin school became Kooralgin State School. It experienced a number of temporary closures before closing permanently in 1963.

In the  Kooralgin had a population of 46 people.

References 

Toowoomba Region
Localities in Queensland